Mahesh Vaman Manjrekar (Marathi pronunciation: [məɦeːʃ maːɲd͡zɾekəɾ]; born 16 August 1958) is an Indian actor, film director, screenwriter and producer who works primarily in Hindi films, alongside Marathi, Telugu and Bhojpuri films. He is credited with directing the critically acclaimed films Vaastav: The Reality (1999), Astitva (2000) and Viruddh... Family Comes First (2005). He has won a National Film Award for Best Feature Film in Marathi for Astitva and two Star Screen Awards. He is also known as host of the reality show, Bigg Boss Marathi since 2018.

Early life 
Mahesh Manjrekar was born on 16 August 1958 in Mumbai, Maharashtra (erstwhile Bombay state). He was brought up in a Marathi Karhade Brahmin family.

Career 
Manjrekar has acted in several films, including some of his own productions. He was first seen in the Door darshan Marathi series named Kshitij, in which he played a leprosy patient. He first gained acclaim as an actor for his performance in the 2002 film Kaante, and later played negative roles in the Tamil film Arrambam (2013), Telugu film Okkadunnadu (2007) and as the gangster Javed in the film Slumdog Millionaire (2008). He played Chatrapati Shivaji Maharaj in the Marathi film Me Shivajiraje Bhosale Boltoy. He also played the role of Harpeez Dongara in the Aakhri Chunauti series of episodes in the Indian TV series C.I.D.. Manjrekar was acclaimed for the role as inspector D.R. Talpade in the movie Wanted.

He was a MNS candidate from Mumbai North West in the 2014 Lok Sabha Elections but lost to Gajanan Kirtikar of Shiv Sena.

Filmography

Actor

Television

Web series

Production 
In 2011, he launched his own production company with Aniruddha Deshpande called Great Maratha Entertainment LLP Productions.

The first film made under the banner was the Fakta Ladh Mhana which is one of the most expensive Marathi films.

Awards and nominations

Personal life

Manjrekar was married to Deepa Mehta, a costume designer but they were divorced with whom he has two children. Later, he married Medha Manjrekar. They have a daughter, Saiee Manjrekar, who is an actress. He has a stepdaughter from his wife Medha Manjrekar's first husband.

References

External links
 

1958 births
Indian male film actors
21st-century Indian film directors
Film producers from Mumbai
Indian male screenwriters
Living people
Film directors from Mumbai
Hindi-language film directors
Male actors in Hindi cinema
Marathi film directors
Male actors in Marathi cinema
Candidates in the 2014 Indian general election
Maharashtra Navnirman Sena politicians
Indian actor-politicians
Male actors from Mumbai
21st-century Indian male actors
Politicians from Mumbai
Male actors in Hindi television
Hindi film producers
Indian television directors
Male actors in Telugu cinema
Male actors in Tamil cinema
Male actors in Bengali cinema
Bigg Boss